The Saint Martin of Tours Parish Church, also known as the Diocesan Shrine of the Holy Cross of Wawa is a Roman Catholic church in Bocaue, Bulacan, Philippines. The church is one of the oldest in Bulacan, having been founded by Franciscan missionaries in 1606. It hosts the Holy Cross of Wawa, a wooden relic believed to be miraculous by devotees, which is the centerpiece of the recurring Bocaue River Festival.

In 1969, the parish founded a church-based credit union cooperative known as the St. Martin of Tours Credit and Development Cooperative (SMTCDC).

References

Roman Catholic churches in Bulacan
Churches in the Roman Catholic Diocese of Malolos